King Radio may refer to:

 King Radio, a calypsonian musician
 King Radio (company)
 KING Radio, a short-lived predecessor to Radio 390

See also
The Radio King